Astroscopus countermani is an extinct species of stargazer described from a cranium found in Tortonian deposits of the Calvert Cliffs of what is now Maryland.  A. countermani is very similar to its living relatives.

References

Uranoscopidae
Miocene fish
Cenozoic animals of North America
Fossil taxa described in 2011